James Buford Jr. (born 1906), nicknamed "Black Bottom", was an American Negro league second baseman between 1929 and 1933. 

A native of Tennessee, Buford made his Negro leagues debut in 1929 with the Nashville Elite Giants. He remained with the club for four seasons, as it moved to Cleveland in 1931 and back to Nashville in 1932. Buford finished his career in 1933 with the Indianapolis ABCs.

References

External links
 and Baseball-Reference Black Baseball stats and Seamheads

1906 births
Place of birth missing
Place of death missing
Date of birth missing
Year of death missing
Cleveland Cubs players
Indianapolis ABCs (1931–1933) players
Nashville Elite Giants players
Baseball second basemen
Baseball players from Tennessee